St Colman's Community College is a second-level school  located in Midleton, County Cork, Ireland.

There are approximately 90 teachers and 950 students in St Colmans Community College. The school has many facilities, including twenty four General classrooms a music room, four woodwork and three Engineering rooms, three technical graphics rooms,three home economics kitchens, six science rooms, three computer rooms, two Art rooms, a Learning Hub, sports facilities, including two sportshalls, basketball courts, and a GAA pitch.  The school is involved in many projects, such as Sci-Fest, PsychSlam, Model UN Green Schools, Clean Coasts, An Gaisce Award, The Amber Group,

The principal is Máirín Lally . The school is a member of Cork Education Training Board CETB.

History 
St Colman's Community College was originally established in Connolly Street, Midleton in 1953, and remained in that location for thirty years. 
In 1980, St Colman's moved to a purpose-built complex on extensive landscaped grounds on the Youghal Road. This move coincided with increasing participation in second-level education in Ireland and as numbers grew further accommodation was required and in 1988 a large extension was added which included a PE Hall, new Science Laboratories, Technology Rooms, additional facilities for Home Economics and a range of additional classrooms.

In January 2020 a new large extension to the school was opened consisting of 15 General classrooms, a music room, a Home Economics Room 3 Computer rooms, 2 Computer Drawing rooms, 2 Art Rooms, A language room, a Learning Hub, an engineering block, a Sports hall.

Curriculum 
The school offers both the Junior and Senior cycles. Junior Cycle students can follow either the Junior Cycle, Junior Cert Schools programme, or Junior Cert Level 2. Senior Cycle students can follow the Leaving Certificate, Leaving Certificate Vocational or Leaving Certificate Applied programmes.The school also operates a large night time education programme.

References

Secondary schools in County Cork